Richard Reader Harris (4 June 1913 – 7 July 2009) was a British Conservative Party politician. He was Member of Parliament for Heston and Isleworth from 1950 until 1970.

Reader Harris was born in Fulham, the son of Richard Reader Harris and Elsie (née Tagen). He was Chairman of Rolls Razor, which made washing machines. In July 1964 the company went bankrupt, and a subsequent investigation revealed irregularities in the company's accounts. In 1969, Harris was charged with carrying on company business with intent to defraud the company's creditors, falsifying the balance sheet, and deceiving investors as to the company's financial state.

With his trial ongoing as the 1970 general election was called, and despite the judge dismissing two charges, the Heston and Isleworth Conservative Association voted to reject Reader Harris and selected instead Barney Hayhoe. On 29 May, Reader Harris was acquitted on the remaining charge; although time remained for his readoption, the Association stuck to its previous choice.

Reader Harris was married to Pamela Stephens from 1940 until their divorce in 1963; their three daughters survive him. He is also survived by his second wife Una. His son from his second marriage died in 2007.

Harris died on 7 July 2009, aged 96 years.

See also
 John Bloom

References

External links 
 
 Richard Reader Harris – Daily Telegraph obituary

1913 births
2009 deaths
Conservative Party (UK) MPs for English constituencies
UK MPs 1950–1951
UK MPs 1951–1955
UK MPs 1955–1959
UK MPs 1959–1964
UK MPs 1964–1966
UK MPs 1966–1970